Lur (also Romanized as Lūr; also known as Lūrbālā Jūq) is a village in Rowzeh Chay Rural District, in the Central District of Urmia County, West Azerbaijan Province, Iran. At the 2006 census, its population was 317, in 73 families.

References 

Populated places in Urmia County